A Cab for Three is a 2001 Chilean film directed by Orlando Lubbert. It was Chile's submission to the 74th Academy Awards for the Academy Award for Best Foreign Language Film, but was not accepted as a nominee.

Plot 
Ulises (Alejandro Trejo) is a taxi driver who gets robbed by Chavelo (Daniel Muñoz) and Coto (Fernando Gómez-Rovira). They give him a choice between driving the taxi while they commit robberies or riding in the trunk, using the phrase "Wheel or trunk." This makes Ulises a member of their gang. After several failed and some successful robberies, Ulises begins to receive a share of the loot. What he once believed was immoral and wrong becomes normalized for him. The robbers even stay in Ulises' home and give gifts to his family, leading them to also cover up for the gang.

Soon, Ulises must choose between the benefits and drawbacks of this new lifestyle.

Cast

 Daniel Muñoz as Chavelo
 Alejandro Trejo as Ulises
 Fernando Gómez-Rovira as Coto
 Ivonne Becerra as Almacenera
 Elsa Poblete as Nelly
 Daniel Alcaíno as TV journalist
 Felipe Ortega as Amaro
 Edgardo Carvajal as Ronny
 Denitze Lecaros as Javiera
 Víctor Rojas as Hugo Soto
 Gerardo Orchard as Julián Castro
 Lorena Prada as office secretary
 Cristián Quezada as Inspector Padilla
 René Castro as Inspector Romero
 Marío Escobar as "Bala Fría"
 Iban Ayala as Evangélico
 Juan Rodríguez as Tricycle boy

See also

List of submissions to the 74th Academy Awards for Best Foreign Language Film

References

External links

2001 films
2000s Spanish-language films
2000s crime comedy-drama films
Chilean comedy-drama films
2001 comedy films
2001 drama films